Robert Mendelsohn may refer to:

 Robert O. Mendelsohn (born 1952), American environmental economist
 Robert S. Mendelsohn (1926–1988), American pediatrician